The allergic salute (sometimes called the nasal salute) is the characteristic and sometimes habitual gesture of wiping and/or rubbing the nose in an upwards or transverse manner with the fingers, palm, or back of the hand. It is termed a salute because the upward movement of the hand acts as an unintentional gesture. The habit of using the hand to wipe the nose is observed more often in children but is common in adults as well. Saluting most commonly temporarily relieves nasal itching as well as removing small amounts of nasal mucus.

In people who are experiencing seizures, nose wiping has been observed as a semivoluntary action.

Process
The upwards wiping of the nose and nostrils allows for running mucus to be wiped off quickly and easily. Also, as the nostrils are being pushed up the air passages through the nose become temporarily propped open. This is especially beneficial if the air passages are swollen and the nostrils are itchy due to irritations such as allergic rhinitis.

The mucus that is wiped onto the hand will most likely carry bacteria and other germs which could then in turn be passed along to other people. Habitual as well as fast or rough saluting may also result in a crease (known as a transverse nasal crease or groove) running across the nose, and can lead to permanent physical deformity observable in childhood and adulthood.

See also
Eskimo kissing
Nose-picking

References

Allergology
Euphemisms
Gestures
Habits
Nose
Rhinology